is a Nippon Professional Baseball player. He is currently with the Hiroshima Toyo Carp of Japan's Central League.

External links

Living people
1983 births
Baseball people from Fukui Prefecture
Japanese baseball players
Nippon Professional Baseball outfielders
Hiroshima Toyo Carp players